Stig Gunnar Andersson-Tvilling (15 July 1928 — 20 September 1989) was a Swedish ice hockey player. He competed at the 1952 and 1956 Winter Olympics, winning a bronze medal in 1952 and finishing fourth in 1956 alongside his twin brother Hans. Besides hockey he also played one international match for the Swedish association football team.

References

External links 
 

1928 births
1989 deaths
Djurgårdens IF Hockey players
Ice hockey players at the 1952 Winter Olympics
Ice hockey players at the 1956 Winter Olympics
Olympic bronze medalists for Sweden
Olympic ice hockey players of Sweden
Olympic medalists in ice hockey
Ice hockey people from Stockholm
Swedish twins
Twin sportspeople
Medalists at the 1952 Winter Olympics
Swedish footballers
Djurgårdens IF Fotboll players
Sundbybergs IK players
Allsvenskan players
Association football defenders
Association football forwards